A large round of regional elections were held in Italy on 31 May 2015 in seven of the twenty regions composing the country, including four of the ten largest ones: Campania, Veneto, Apulia and Tuscany. The other three regions holding elections were Liguria, Marche, Umbria.

Overall results

Regional councils

Presidents of the regions

Results by region

Veneto

Liguria

Tuscany

Umbria

Marche

Campania

Apulia

References

Elections in Italian regions
2015 elections in Italy
May 2015 events in Italy